Lauritzen Bay is a bay about  wide, occupied by bay ice and ice shell, indenting the coast of Antarctica between Cape Yevgenov and Coombes Ridge. The Matusevich Glacier Tongue joins Coombes Ridge in forming the west side of the bay. It was photographed from the air by U.S. Navy Operation Highjump in 1947, and was sketched and photographed by Phillip Law, leader of the Australian National Antarctic Research Expedition (ANARE) on the Magga Dan on February 20, 1959. It was then named by the Antarctic Names Committee of Australia for shipowner Knud Lauritzen of Copenhagen, Denmark, who supplied the Magga Dan and other vessels used by ANARE since 1954.

References

Bays of Antarctica